John Burrell may refer to:

 John Burrell (poet), Scottish poet and goldsmith
 John Burrell (American football) (born 1940), former American football wide receiver
 John Burrell (entomologist) (1762–1825), English entomologist
 John Burrell (theatre director) (1910–1972), English theatre director
 John Burrell (cricketer) (1870–1948), English cricketer